Daniel Woodrow Bird Jr. (born December 26, 1938) is an American attorney and politician who served as a member of the Virginia state senate from 1976 to 1992. He mounted an unsuccessful bid for Governor in 1989, dropping out and supporting Douglas Wilder before the Democratic primary.

His father, D. Woodrow Bird, served for many years in the General Assembly.

References

External links 
 

1938 births
Living people
Democratic Party Virginia state senators
20th-century American politicians